The 2012 United States Senate election in Maryland took place on November 6, 2012, concurrently with the 2012 U.S. presidential election as well as other elections to the United States Senate, House of Representatives, and various state and local elections. Incumbent Democratic U.S. Senator Ben Cardin won re-election to a second term, defeating Republican nominee Dan Bongino and independent Rob Sobhani.

Democratic primary

Candidates

Declared 
 Raymond Blagmon
 Ben Cardin, incumbent U.S. Senator
 J.P. Cusick
 Christopher Garner, engineer and businessman
 Ralph Jaffe, former political science teacher
 C. Anthony Muse, State Senator
 Blaine Taylor
 Ed Tinus
 Lih Young, perennial candidate

Results

Republican primary

Candidates

Declared 
 Joseph Alexander
 Dan Bongino, former United States Secret Service agent
 Bro Broadus
 William Capps
 Richard Douglas, attorney and former Deputy Assistant Secretary of Defense
 Rick Hoover
 David Jones
 John B. Kimble, behavioral scientist and perennial candidate
 Brian Vaeth, retired firefighter
 Corrogan R. Vaughn, perennial candidate

Declined 
 Bob Ehrlich, former Governor of Maryland
 Brian Murphy, candidate for Governor in 2010
 Eric Wargotz, nominee for the U.S. Senate in 2010

Results

General election

Candidates 
 Ben Cardin (Democratic), Incumbent U.S. Senator and former U.S. Representative
 Daniel Bongino (Republican), former United States Secret Service agent
 Dean Ahmad (Libertarian), President of the Minaret of Freedom Institute
 S. Rob Sobhani (Independent), Chairman and CEO of Caspian Group Holdings
 Brandy Baker (Socialist, certified write-in)

Debates 
A candidate's forum was held on Baltimore's WOLB radio on October 24 including Senator Ben Cardin, Rob Sobhani, Dean Ahmad and Daniel Bongino. An October 30 debate at Salisbury University to have featured those candidates and independent Ed Tinus was cancelled in the aftermath of Hurricane Sandy.

Campaign 
In 2006, then-U.S. Representative Ben Cardin defeated then-Lieutenant Governor Michael Steele 54%–44%. Eric Wargotz, the Republican nominee in 2010 had considered entering the race but ultimately did not.

In both 2009 and 2010, National Journal magazine rated Cardin as tied for most liberal senator, based on his voting record. As of June 30, Cardin had $1.8 million in his campaign account.

Fundraising

Top contributors

Top industries

Predictions

Polling

Results

Results by county

Counties that flipped from Democrat to Republican
Anne Arundel
Calvert
Dorchester
Somerset
Wicomico

See also
2012 United States Senate elections
2012 United States elections

References

Notes

External links 
 Maryland State Board of Elections
 Campaign contributions at OpenSecrets
 Outside spending at the Sunlight Foundation
 Candidate issue positions at On the Issues
 United States Senate elections in Maryland, 2012 at Ballotpedia

Daniel Bongino
 Daniel Bongino for U.S. Senate
 

Ben Cardin
 Ben Cardin for U.S. Senate

Rob Sobhani
 Rob Sobhani for U.S. Senate

2012
Maryland
United States Senate